Promontorium Taenarium is a headland on the near side of the Moon. It is located in the eastern end of Mare Nubium. Its length is about 70 km.

The name Promontorium Taenarium was first used by Johannes Hevelius in his 1647 map of the Moon, but this refers  to a bright point at crater Guericke B. Taenarium refers to Cape Tainaron (known as Cape Matapan), the southernmost point of the Peloponnese peninsula of Greece.

References

External links

Promontorium Taenarium at Moon Wiki
  - features the promontory

Mountains on the Moon